Sing Again  is a South Korean television program that airs on JTBC starting November 16, 2020. Season 1 aired at 22:30 (KST) on Monday. It was scheduled for a season 2 after garnering positive response from viewers.

Season 2, starting on December 6, 2021, aired at 21:00 (KST) every Monday.

Both seasons are hosted by Lee Seung-gi.

Overview

There are many unknown singers all over the world, singers who have been short-lived but have been forgotten, and singers who are capable but have not come across an opportunity to debut. These singers are given a second chance to "sing again" through the show in this new-concept rebirth talent show.

Judges and MC

Series overview

Ratings

Season 1: 2020-2021

Season 2: 2021-Present

Spin-offs

Famous Singer (2021)

Famous Singer  is a Sing Again spin-off program that runs from April 2, 2021 – June 22, 2021. It features the Top 3 contestants from Sing Again season 1.On the new program, the Top 3 finalists include winner Lee Seung Yoon, runner-up Jeong Hong Il, and third-place contestant Lee Moo Jin, will be meeting with Korea's legendary singers to talk about music and perform covers and collaborations.

References

External links
  

South Korean variety television shows
Korean-language television shows
2021 South Korean television series debuts
JTBC original programming
2020s South Korean television series